The Changchun Wuhuan Gymnasium is an indoor arena in Changchun, China. The arena used mainly for indoor sports. The facility has a capacity of 11,428 people and was opened in 1994. It hosted the Short track speed skating and figure skating as well as the opening and closing ceremonies for the 2007 Asian Winter Games.

See also
 Sports in China

External links
 Arena information

Indoor arenas in China
Sports venues in Jilin
Sports venues completed in 1994
1994 establishments in China